Bryngwyn Comprehensive School is a secondary school located in Llanelli, Carmarthenshire, Wales. The school has received excellent overall GCSE marks with the majority of the students achieving a A* - C grade.

Notable pupils include Scarlets and Wales international player Samson Lee, professional cyclist Edward Laverack, and 7 time Mr Olympia 212 champion Flex Lewis.

External links
Ysgol Bryngwyn School website

Llanelli
Secondary schools in Carmarthenshire